National character studies is a set of anthropological studies conducted during and immediately after World War II. This involves the identification of people, ethnicity, and races according to specific, indomitable cultural characteristics. While a number of investigations were considered benign, there were some scholars of the opinion that these studies should never have been attempted at all. This is demonstrated in the case of social Darwinism, which holds that a successful people - as demonstrated in a victory in war or economic development - is presumed to have advanced in the evolutionary tree ahead of a vanquished nation or those people in developing or poor countries. 
An essay on National Character, as applied to foreign economic aid to developing nations, is contained in Ludwig Rudel's Memoir Agent for Change in International Development (Volume 2 Annex 1B, page 352).  Shortly after the end of World War II, the U.S. undertook programs to provide economic assistance on a global scale, initially to rebuild Europe through the Marshall Plan, then under Truman's Point Four program. The U.S. was soon accused of imposing its system on other societies which had their own, very different, value systems and behavior patterns. The U.S. was said to be making other countries into its own image with a "one size fits all" approach.
The International Cooperation Administration and then USAID took this criticism seriously. A battery of anthropologists and sociologists was hired to correct this bias. There was recognition that societies do not all follow some universal standard of behavior. What may work well in one country to serve its social objectives, may not work in another. It was argued that one should not be judgmental about the efficacy of one societal behavior system over another. 
A major work on national character is Ruth Benedict's book, "Patterns of Culture", written in 1934. In it, she argues that, "A culture, like an individual, is a more or less consistent pattern of thought and action". Margaret Mead, in her foreword to the book, summarizes Benedict's conception as "human cultures being personality writ large". Benedict was one of the cultural anthropologists recruited by the US government after its entry into World War II. She played a major role in grasping the place of the Emperor of Japan in popular Japanese culture and formulated the recommendation to President Roosevelt that the continuation of the Emperor's reign should be part of the surrender offer.

On the other hand, there are scholars who cite benefits in pursuing national character studies such as those who cite its contribution to the modern anthropological understanding of the rise of nations and international relations.

History
National character studies arose from a variety of approaches with Culture and Personality, including the configurationalist approach of Edward Sapir and Ruth Benedict, the basic personality structure developed by Ralph Linton and Abram Kardiner, and the modal personality approach of Cora DuBois.  These approaches disagreed with each other on the exact relationship between personality and culture.  The configurationalist and basic approaches both treated personalities within a culture as relatively homogeneous, while Cora DuBois argued that there are no common personality traits found in every single member of a society.

Examples of national character studies in America include those undertaken to differentiate the Japanese character from the Chinese within the initiative of understanding Asians on a more strategic level after the attack on Pearl Harbor in 1941. These were conducted by a group of specialists, including sociologists, anthropologists, and psychologists. By 1953, national character studies included the cultures of France, Spain, Czechoslovakia, Poland, Russia, East European Jews, Syria, and China.

Major works
Major works on national character include:

 Ruth Benedict's The Chrysanthemum and the Sword on Japanese national character. Because researchers could not enter Japan at the time, Benedict conducted her research as "fieldwork-at-a-distance" through literature, film, and Japanese expatriates (mostly internment camp victims) in the United States.  Although her work can be criticized for returning to the "armchair anthropology" of the earliest anthropologists (such as Edward Tylor), other scholars of Japan have verified the symbolic importance of aestheticism and militarism for national identity (which is not necessarily to say individual personality).
 Margaret Mead's And Keep Your Powder Dry: An Anthropologist Looks at America (1942)
 Geoffrey Gorer's The People of Great Russia: A Psychological Study (1949)

This last monograph led to the demise of National Character Studies and Culture and Personality as a whole due to its poor reception.  In it, Gorer argues that the personality of the Russians, so distasteful to their enemies and his sponsor, the Americans, resulting from their practice of swaddling infants, wrapping them tightly in blankets.  This, Gorer posited, generated cold and removed personalities in adulthood.  This theory became known as the "swaddling hypothesis", and was generally regarded as unworkable, simplistic, and hastily determined.

The main contribution of Culture and Personality was to show that, revolutionary at the time, socialization continued beyond infancy and early childhood, and national discourses could have an effect on personal character.  The entire approach is now considered defunct.

See also 
Collective memory
Cultural determinism
Ethnic stereotype
Margaret Mead
Nationalism
Nihonjinron
Seny
Sisu

References

External links 

Electronic Database "National Mentalities: Studies in the Context of Globalization and Interaction of Cultures"

Social anthropology